Eden is an unincorporated community in Logan Township, Peoria County, Illinois, United States.

History
Eden was originally called Milo, and under the latter name was founded in the 1880s when the railroad was extended to that point. A post office was established under the name Eden in 1882, and remained in operation until the 1960s.

References

Unincorporated communities in Peoria County, Illinois
Unincorporated communities in Illinois
Peoria metropolitan area, Illinois